The Kenyan High Commissioner in London is the official representative of the government in Nairobi to the government of the United Kingdom.

List of representatives

Source:
List of High Commissioners of the United Kingdom to Kenya

References 

 
United Kingdom
Kenya